Grevers is a surname. Notable people with the surname include:

Chantal Grevers (born 1961), Dutch cricketer
Matt Grevers (born 1985), American swimmer

See also
Grever